Ayumi Hamasaki 15th Anniversary Tour: A Best Live  is Japanese pop singer Ayumi Hamasaki's 36th DVD/Blu-ray release. It was released on October 30, 2013.
The tour was held to celebrate Hamasaki's 15th anniversary in the music industry, with her performing 28 shows in Japan from mid-April to late July. 
The tour started on April 13, 2013 at Saitama Super Arena and finished with two final shows at Yoyogi National Gymnasium on July 27 and 28, 2013.

The DVD peaked at No. 3 on the weekly Oricon DVD Chart, with the Blu-ray reaching No. 3, as well.

Release
The DVD/Blu-ray was released in four formats, the first two being a standard 2DVD version and the Blu-ray version. The other two formats are the limited 2DVD + Live Photobook and the Blu-ray + Live Photobook version. The photobook includes 88 pages.

Track list
Track list taken from Avex.

Disc 1
 "interlude"
 "A Song for ××"
 "Memorial Address"
 "Massive Trance Station"
 "Poker Face"
 "Fly High"
 "Honey"
 "Show Time"
 "M"
 "No Way to Say"
 "You & Me"
 "Blue Bird"
 "innervisions
 "Jewel"
 "Heaven"
 "Ever Free"
 "Wake Me Up"
 "Tell All"
 "Surreal" ～ "Evolution" ～ "Surreal"
 "Voyage"
Encore
 "Teddy Bear"
 "Sunrise (Love Is All)"
 "Boys & Girls"
 "Who..."
Double Encore
 "My All"

Disc 2
 Screen Videos (2 titles)

Charts

References

Ayumi Hamasaki video albums
2013 video albums
Live video albums
2013 live albums